KCZO (92.1 FM) is a radio station broadcasting a Spanish format. Licensed to Carrizo Springs, Texas, United States. The station is currently owned by Paulino Bernal Evangelism.

Translators
In addition to the main station, KCZO is relayed by an additional 25 translators to widen its broadcast area.

References

External links

Radio stations established in 1992
1992 establishments in Texas
CZO